This is a complete list of all committees currently operating in the Senate of the Czech Republic.

Committees 
 Committee on Agenda and Procedure
Chairperson: Milan Štěch
1st Vice-Chairperson: Přemysl Sobotka
Vice-Chairpersons: 
Ivo Bárek
Miluše Horská
Zdeněk Škromach
members: 
Zdeňka Hamousová
Jan Horník
Jiří Oberfalzer
Petr Šilar
Dagmar Terelmešová
Jan Veleba
Petr Vícha
Veronika Vrecionová
 Committee on Mandate and Parliamentary Privilege
 Chairperson: Jiří Oberfalzer
Vice-Chairpersons: 
Zdeněk Besta
Jaroslav Malý
Leopold Sulovský
members:
 Miroslav Antl
 Jiří Carbol
 Jaroslav Kubera
 Jan Látka
 Miloš Malý
 Jaroslav Palas
 Jaroslav Zeman
 Committee on Legal and Constitutional Affairs
Chairperson: Miroslav Antl
Vice-Chairpersons: 
Jiří Burian
Stanislav Juránek
Miloš Malý
Radek Sušil
members: 
Jaroslav Kubera
Miroslav Nenutil
Emilie Třísková
Eliška Wagnerová
 Committee on National Economy, Agriculture and Transport
Chairperson: Ivan Adamec
Vice-Chairpersons: 
Karel Kratochvíle
Jaromír Strnad
Veronika Vrecionová
members: 
František Bradáč
Petr Bratský
František Čuba
Jiří Hlavatý
Libor Michálek
Leopold Sulovský
Petr Šilar
Pavel Štohl
Jan Veleba
 Committee on Public Administration, Regional Development and the Environment
Chairperson: Miloš Vystrčil
Vice-Chairpersons: 
Pavel Eybert
Petr Gawlas
Jitka Seitlová
Martin Tesařík
members: 
Jiří Carbol
Zdeňka Hamousová
Jan Horník
Zbyněk Linhart
Radko Martínek
Ivo Valenta
Petr Vícha
 Committee on Education, Science, Culture, Human Rights and Petitions
Chairperson: Jaromír Jermář
Vice-Chairpersons: 
Zdeněk Berka
Milan Pešák
Eva Syková
Jiří Šesták
members: 
Zuzana Baudyšová
Jiří Čunek
Václav Homolka
Jaroslav Malý
Jiří Oberfalzer
 Committee on Foreign Affairs, Defence and Security
Chairperson: František Bublan
Vice-Chairpersons: 
Zdeněk Brož
Tomáš Jirsa
Hassan Mezian
Josef Táborský
members: 
Lubomír Franc
Patrik Kunčar
Václav Láska
Jaroslav Palas
Jozef Regec
 Committee on EU Affairs
Chairperson: Václav Hampl
Vice-Chairpersons: 
Jaroslav Doubrava
Jan Látka
Antonín Maštalíř
members: 
Lumír Aschenbrenner
Zdeněk Besta
Tomáš Grulich
Luděk Jeništa
Peter Koliba
 Committee on Health and Social Policy
Chairperson: Jan Žaloudík
Vice-Chairpersons: 
Alena Dernerová
Milada Emmerová
Vladimír Plaček
Jaroslav Zeman
members: 
Ivana Cabrnochová
Daniela Filipiová
Zdeněk Papoušek
Božena Sekaninová
Alena Šromová
Dagmar Terelmešová
Jiří Vosecký

External links 
Official website of the Senate (CZ)
Official website of the Senate (ENG)
Official list of the committees

Government of the Czech Republic
Senate committees